Matata is a town in Eswatini.

Location
The geographical coordinates of Matata, Swaziland are: 26°52'00.0"S, 31°55'28.0"E (Latitude:-26.866672; Longitude:31.924455).

Overview
Matata the town, is home to the business known as Matata Group of Companies. The businesses include supermarkets, retail stores, farm machinery outlets, abattoirs, cattle ranches, a butchery, sugar farms, and maize plantations. The majority of adults in Matata the town, are employed in Matata the business group.

Population
In 2014, the population of Matata, was estimated at over 3,000 people.

Points of interest
Eswatini Bank, the only indigenous commercial bank in Eswatini, maintains a branch in Matata.

See also
List of banks in Eswatini

References

Populated places in Lubombo Region
Lubombo Region